Schneckenlohe is a municipality  in the district of Kronach in Bavaria in Germany.

Twin towns — sister cities
Schneckenlohe is twinned with:

 Borghetto di Vara, Italy (1993)

References

Kronach (district)